Richard E. "Ricky" Atkinson Jr. (born August 28, 1965) is a former professional American football player who played defensive back in 1987 for the New England Patriots in the National Football League.

External links
Pro-Football-Reference

1965 births
Living people
Sportspeople from Middletown, Connecticut
Players of American football from Connecticut
American football defensive backs
Southern Connecticut State Owls football players
New England Patriots players